H. L. v. Matheson, 450 U.S. 398 (1981), was a United States Supreme Court abortion rights case, according to which a state may require a doctor to inform a teenaged girl's parents before performing an abortion or face criminal penalty.

Overview
A female minor, known by her initials H.L., was living in Utah with her parents when she became pregnant in 1978. A doctor advised H.L. that an abortion would be in her best medical interests. A Utah law enacted in 1974 required abortion providers to "[n]otify, if possible" the parents of any female under the age of majority who is scheduled to undergo an abortion, at least 24 hours before the abortion. Violation was a misdemeanor subject to a fine up to $1000 and/or several months imprisonment. H.L. initiated a lawsuit as part of a proposed class action of unmarried unemancipated females, arguing that Utah's parental notification statute was unconstitutional. Scott M. Matheson, then the governor of Utah, was named as the defendant. 

The case made its way to the Utah Supreme Court, where the law was upheld as consistent with Roe v. Wade (1973). The judgment noted, among other points, that H.L.'s proposed class action was overly broad; and that the Utah statute mandated parental notification but did not grant parents authority to stop such an abortion.

The case was appealed to the Supreme Court of the United States of America. Utah's statute was upheld on a 6 to 3 vote.

See also
 List of United States Supreme Court cases, volume 450

References

Further reading

External links
 

United States Supreme Court cases
United States Supreme Court cases of the Burger Court
United States abortion case law
United States privacy case law
Right to abortion under the United States Constitution
Right to privacy under the United States Constitution
1981 in United States case law
Legal history of Utah